Nothing Above My Shoulders but the Evening is Ray Lynch’s fifth and final studio album. It reflects Lynch's classical background and features performances by members of the San Francisco Symphony. The album was released after Lynch signed with Windham Hill Records. It peaked at #1 on Billboards "Top New Age Albums" chart.

Production
According to Keyboard, the album was originally slated to be released "during the first quarter" of 1992.  In an interview with the Vancouver Sun, Lynch revealed some of the struggles he faced while creating the album, and said that it had taken four years to create. In regards to its delayed production, he said, "That's the problem when you love what you make, if you love what you make and care about it, you're going to struggle with it until it's right." In an interview with Brian, Mind in 1995, Ray Lynch explained that he shifted more closely to acoustic instruments than synthesized instruments. He further explained that he had always wanted to write a "very classical" album.

Reception
Debbie Stover of the St. Louis Post-Dispatch praised the album for its use of instruments to recreate the sound of both the Baroque and Renaissance eras while also "managing to sound fully modern." Stover concluded her review by calling it "easily one of the year's best." Elisabeth Le Guin of The New York Times praised the album for evoking "the highly colored emotions of the classical tradition" and described the album's sound as "pop Dvorak".

Track listing
Nothing Above My Shoulders but the Evening includes the following tracks. All tracks are written by Ray Lynch.

Personnel 
All music composed, arranged and produced by Ray Lynch.
 Ray Lynch – keyboards and guitars
 Timothy Day – flute and alto flute
 Nancy Ellis and Nanci Severance – viola
 Glen Fischthal – trumpet, fluglehorn, and piccolo trumpet
 Julie Ann Giacobassi – oboe and English horn
 David Kadarauch – cello
 Dave Krehbiel – French horn
 Daniel Kobialka – violin
 Marc Shapiro – piano

Production 
 Ray Lynch and Daniel Ryman – engineering and mixing
 Bernie Grundman Mastering, Hollywood, California – mastering

Charts

References

Ray Lynch albums
1993 albums
Windham Hill Records albums